Tai'an is a prefecture-level city in Western Shandong Province of the People's Republic of China. Centered on Mount Tai, the city borders the provincial capital of Jinan to the north, Zibo to the east, Linyi to the southeast, Liaocheng to the extreme west and Jining to the south. To the west, Tai'an is separated from the province of Henan by the Yellow River.

Its population was 5,494,207 as of the 2010 census, of whom 1,735,425 lived in the built-up (or metro) area made of two urban districts (Taishan District and Daiyue District).

Administration
The prefecture-level city of Tai'an administers six county-level divisions, including two districts, two county-level cities and two counties.

Taishan District
Daiyue District
Xintai City
Feicheng City
Ningyang County
Dongping County

History

Etymology
Tai'an is named after Mount Tai. In Chinese, Tai means "significant". Thus, the name Tai'an is derived from the ancient saying: "If Mount Tai is safe, then the four seas (the world) are safe. "

Early history
Tai'an was home to the Dawenkou culture during the neolithic era. During the Spring and Autumn period and the Warring States period, the region belonged to the states of Qi and Lu. The site of major historical and cultural significance in the area is Mount Tai. It attracted multiple emperors throughout the dynasties to visit, offer sacrifice to the heaven gods and pray for harvest. Confucius, Sima Qian, Cao Zhi, Li Bai, Du Fu and other litterateurs visited here and many great works were produced.

Modern history
In 1909, German colonials built Tai'an-Fu Railway Station along with the construction of Tianjin–Pukou railway (Tientsin–Pukow railway). On 10 November of the following year, the first train service passed through the station.

On 1 May 1928, Chiang Kai-shek, the leader of KMT and nationalist revolutionary army, commanded the attack of Tai'an and occupied it the next day.

In October 1937, exiled students from Peking, Tianjin and other major cities arrived in Tai'an seeking asylum after the north of Yellow river was occupied by the Japanese forces. 
On 24 December 1937, Japanese troops crossed the Yellow River, occupied Jinan on the next day, and bombed Tai'an. On the night of 31 December, the Japanese occupied Tai'an. Local resistants were assembled autonomously to fight against the occupation.

Geography and climate
Tai'an is centered on the south side of Mount Tai. Dongping Lake is the biggest lake.

Tai'an lies in the northern temperate zone and has a continental, semi-humid monsoon climate.

Education

Shandong University of Science and Technology
Shandong First Medical University 
Shandong Agricultural University 
Taishan University 
Tai'an Public Health School
Tai'an Polytechnic College
Shandong Foreign Trade Vocational College Taian Campus

Secondary schools
 Tai’an the first high school (泰安一中)

Transportation
Tai'an is served by Tai'an railway station on the Beijing–Shanghai high-speed railway and Taishan railway station on the Beijing–Shanghai railway.

Tai'an is served by the G2 Beijing–Shanghai Expressway and on the Tai-Lai Expressway (west-east from Tai'an to Laiwu). There is a four-lane highway from Tai'an to the Jinan Yaoqiang International Airport. Within Tai'an there are large tree lined avenues throughout the city.

See also
List of twin towns and sister cities in China

References

External links

Government website of Tai'an (in Simplified Chinese)

Cities in Shandong
Prefecture-level divisions of Shandong